Mumbai Fables is a 2010 non-fiction book about the history of Mumbai, authored by Gyan Prakash. Bombay Velvet (2015), directed by Anurag Kashyap, is based on this book.

References

2010 non-fiction books
Indian non-fiction books
Culture of Mumbai
History of Mumbai
21st-century Indian books
Indian novels adapted into films